The DR Congo women's national football team represents the Democratic Republic of the Congo in international women's football. It is governed by the Congolese Association Football Federation. FIFA refers to DR Congo as Congo DR.

History
DR Congo was scheduled to debut against Namibia on the 1998 African Women's Championship qualifiers, to be held in Nigeria, but it withdrew. They debuted against Egypt on 17 October 1998 in Kaduna, Nigeria, and won 4–1. At the second encounter against the hosts, Nigeria, they lost by 6–0 and in the last match of the Group Stage, they drew with Morocco 0–0 and advanced to the semi-finals by scoring 7 goals and receiving 7. In the semi-finals Ghana beat them by 4–1 after extra time, to play the third place match in which they drew 3–3 to Cameroon, winning the 3rd place by scoring 3–1 on the penalty shootout, but did not qualify to the 1999 FIFA Women's World Cup, to be held in the United States.

The team did not enter the 2000 African Women's Championship. In the 2002 African Women's Championship qualifiers they faced Angola. The first leg was a 1–0 loss and the second was a 1–0 win, but a 5–4 penalty shootout loss, leaving Congo DR out of the tournament and the World Cup, held again in the United States.

They played on the 2003 All-Africa Games in Nigeria, all the encounters in Kaduna, against Algeria (4 October, won 5–2), Mali (7 October, draw 0–0) and South Africa (10 October, lost 4–0). Congo DR also played against Ghana and lost 2–0 (26 October in Kumasi) and 2–1 (9 November in Kinshasa). The team did withdraw from the 2004 African Women's Championship when it was scheduled to play against Gabon in the qualifiers.

Congo DR faced Zambia in the 2006 African Women's Championship qualifiers and won 3–0 and 3–2, having a score of 6–2 in aggregate and advancing to the next round. In the Second Round they played against Senegal, winning 3–0 in the First Leg and losing 2–0 in the Second, qualifying for the 2006 African Women's Championship who was held in Nigeria from 28 October to 11 November 2006. Congo DR was in the Group B along with Ghana, Cameroon and Mali. The opening encounter was against Cameroon and ended in a 1–1 draw with goal of Milandu at the 57 minutes. The second rival was Mali and lost 3–2 with goals of Zuma and Matufa at the 28 and 85 minutes respectively. Closing match was versus Ghana and ended in a 3–1 loss with goal of Vumongo at the 51 minutes. Congo DR was again eliminated from the tournament and from the World Cup held in China PR.

After two months, the team faced Cameroon on 22 January 2007 and lost 3–0. After that encounter they faced Namibia on 17 February and 10 March, drawing 3–3 and winning 5–2 respectively. On 3 and 17 June Congo DR played against Ghana in Sunyani and Kinshasa, losing both 3–1 and 1–0. For the 2008 African Women's Championship, held in Equatorial Guinea from 15 November to 29 November 2008. They played the qualifiers against Congo, losing 4–1 and drawing 1–1, leaving an aggregate score of 5–2. After these results, Congo DR did not qualify up for the Tournament.

On 7 March 2010 in Gaborone, after 2 years of no matches played, Congo DR faced Botswana, for the 2010 African Women's Football Championship qualification, winning over them 2–0 with goals of Malembo and Dianteso at the 11 and 17 minutes. At the Second Leg, on 19 March 2010, they won again, this time by 5–2 with two goals of Malembo (20 and 27 minutes), two of Nzuzi (24 and 28 minutes) and Mafutu at the 88 minutes. Second Round was against Cameroon, and they lost both matches by 2–0 and 3–0, leaving them again eliminated from both the 2010 African Women's Championship and the World Cup held in Germany.

Congo DR played two matches against Ethiopia on 15 and 30 January 2011, drawing in the first match 0–0 and losing the second by 3–0. In February of the same year, they withdrew from the All-Africa Games qualifiers, in where the team was scheduled to play against Gabon.

In 14 and 28 February 2012, the team faced Uganda, in the 2012 African Women's Football Championship qualification, in where they draw 1–1 and win 4–0. In May and June 2012, they were scheduled to play against Equatorial Guinea, but matches were cancelled, because Equatorial Guinea was selected hosts of the tournament, Congo DR also qualified, by the virtue of a "walkover". Two matches against their supposed rival, Equatorial Guinea were played on June 24 and 26, 4 months before the Championship, both losing by 3–0 and 2–1. Another match before the Cup was played, it was against Cameroon and was a 0–0 draw. Final Tournament was held between 28 October and 11 November 2012, the team was placed in Group A, along with hosts Equatorial Guinea, South Africa and Senegal. The first match against Senegal was won 1–0 by a penalty of Nona at the 74 minutes. The Second encounter against Equatorial Guinea was lost 6–0. They faced South Africa at the last match of the Group and lose 4–1 with a goal of Tutzolana at the 88 minutes. Again Congo DR were eliminated in the Group Stage.

After a long hiatus from competitive play, Congo DR returned to compete in the CAF qualifiers for the 2020 Summer Olympics in Tokyo. Previous attempts at qualifying for the Olympics in 2004, 2008, and 2012 had been unsuccessful, with the team's deepest run taking them only as far as the second round. Congo DR opened the 2020 qualifying campaign with a 2–2 draw away to Tanzania, then advanced to the second round with a 1–0 win in the second leg of the fixture. Their second round opponent, Equatorial Guinea withdrew, seeing Congo DR through to the third round to face Cameroon. After suffering a 0–2 loss in the first leg at Yaoundé, Congo DR built a 2–0 lead at home only to see a late goal by Ajara Nchout knock them out of the tournament with a 2–3 loss on aggregate.

Team image

Home stadium
The DR Congo women's national football team plays their home matches on the Stade des Martyrs.

Results and fixtures

The following is a list of match results in the last 12 months, as well as any future matches that have been scheduled.

2023

2022

Coaching staff

Current coaching staff

Players

Current squad
The following players were selected to compete in 2022 Africa Women Cup of Nations qualification (first round).

Match dates: 20 and 24 October 2021.

Recent call ups
The following players have been called up to the DR Congo squad in the past 12 months.

Records

*Active players in bold, statistics correct as of 2 August 2021.

Most capped players

Top goalscorers

Competitive record

FIFA Women's World Cup

Olympic Games

Africa Women Cup of Nations

*Draws include knockout matches decided on penalty kicks.

African Games

UNIFFAC Women's Cup

See also
Sport in the Democratic Republic of the Congo
Football in the Democratic Republic of the Congo
Women's football in the Democratic Republic of the Congo

References

External links
FIFA Team Profile

 
Football in the Democratic Republic of the Congo
African women's national association football teams